The Franklin S. Harris Fine Arts Center (HFAC) is the main location for Brigham Young University's (BYU) College of Fine Arts and Communications, housing most of the college's departments and divisions. It consists of several named stages and concert spaces, as well as classrooms, study rooms, painting studios, theatre work rooms, and faculty offices.

The arts center was inaugurated in 1964. The HFAC was designed by architect William Pereira in the modernist style popular at the time of its construction. The building is notable for its dramatic multi-floor, open, interior atrium that serves as an exhibition gallery and an acoustically-resonate space for occasional concerts. The building’s entrances feature four dramatic open patios. The patios’ open design maximizes natural light to multiple wings and creates exterior workspaces for students.

The HFAC is located immediately to the south of the Museum of Art, and just north of the Wilkinson Student Center.

In 2022, BYU announced plans to demolish the building and build a new arts building in its place, in addition to the new music building announced a few years prior. Construction is set to begin in 2023. In the meantime, non-musical programs formerly housed in the HFAC will temporarily occupy renovated space in the former Provo High School building.

General Overview
The HFAC houses the School of Music, the Department of Theatre and Media Arts, the Department of Art, the Department of Design, and BYU Arts Production.

The HFAC has over 100 rooms of various types, including 53 practice rooms and four art galleries.

The building has seven pipe organs that are considered to be amongst the most notable in Utah, the oldest of which dates back to 1970, although it has since been largely rebuilt.

Named Areas

Following is a list and short explanations of named areas in the HFAC.

de Jong Concert Hall
The De Jong Concert Hall is the largest room in the HFAC.  It is named for Gerrit de Jong, Jr. who was the first dean of the College of Fine Arts at BYU.  The hall has a seating capacity of 1269. It is used for most concerts, both by choral groups and symphonic groups as well as many musicals, operas and dance performances.  It is also used during the spring and summer terms for the weekly university devotionals.  While most concerts at the de Jong are by BYU groups, outside groups such as the Utah Symphony also perform there.

Events at the de Jong not only generate articles in the BYU paper but also are mentioned in Salt Lake City publications such as the Deseret News and the Salt Lake Tribune  as well as in independent Latter-day Saint oriented magazines such as Meridian Magazine.

The hall is so central to the school of music's operations that studies aimed at getting ideal sound quality in the hall have been published by the Audio Engineering Society.

The de Jong hall was designed by Harvey Fletcher.

B. Cecil Gates Opera Workshop
Located right next to the de Jong Concert hall this room is used for rehearsals of student produced operas.  It is named for B. Cecil Gates.

Bent F. Larsen Art Gallery
This is a three level gallery, most of the space being on the main floor with the two higher floors opening onto the main floor.  Besides being used for various art displays, it serves as the lobby for most of the main theatres, such as the Pardoe, the Madsen Recital Hall and the de Jong Concert Hall.

The Larsen Art Gallery is also periodically used as a site for dances.

The Larsen Art Gallery has been used for presentations by the BYU Conservation Laboratory of Fine Art.

The Larsen Gallery is rated as one of the best art galleries in Provo.

Franklin and Florence Jepperson Madsen Recital Hall
The Franklin and Florence Jepperson Madsen Recital Hall accommodates choral group practices during the week.  It is also used for solo and chamber productions by students, faculty and even at times visiting groups.

The Madsen Recital Hall was the main location of the 2005 Primrose International Viola Competition, sponsored by the American Viola Society.

Elbert H. Eastmond Art Seminar Room

Philip N. Margetts Arena Theatre
This theatre is designed so that seating and acting can occur in any part of the room.

Miriam Nelke Experimental Theatre
Besides being used for theatre productions, this theatre is also at times used for the College of Fine Arts and Communications Thursday forums.

T. Earl and Kathryn Pardoe Drama Theatre
This theatre seats 509 people and is designed in a tradition proscenium stage setup.

Laycock Endowment 
The Laycock Endowment began in 2003 and works to connect students with actual projects for clients, that normally involve inter-disciplinary cooperation. From 2011-2016 the Laycock Center for Creative Collaboration in the Arts (created to house the endowment work) operated as an official center in the College of Fine Arts and Communications. The Center included work for various BYU entities, and a reading application developed for the US Library of Congress.

References

External links

 BYU Department of Visual Arts Galleries
 BYU Arts: Venues
 List of and short explanation of named areas in the HFAC

University and college arts centers in the United States
University and college academic buildings in the United States
Event venues established in 1964
William Pereira buildings
Arts centers in Utah
Performing arts centers in Utah
Brigham Young University buildings
Tourist attractions in Provo, Utah
1964 establishments in Utah